The term spiral valve may refer to:

 Intestinal spiral valves, the lower portion of the intestine of some sharks, rays, skates and bichirs
 Spiral valves of Heister, valves in the proximal mucosa of the cystic duct
 The spiral valve of the conus arteriosus, as found in some amphibians and lungfish